The 2009 Italian Athletics Championships was the 99th edition of the Italian Athletics Championships and were held in Grosseto from 31 July – 2 August.

Champions

References

External links 
 Italian Athletics Federation

2009 in athletics (track and field)
2009 in Italian sport
2009
Sports competitions in Milan